The Pixel 5a, also known as the Pixel 5a with 5G, is an Android smartphone designed, developed, and marketed by Google as part of the Google Pixel product line. It serves as a mid-range variant of the Pixel 5. It was officially announced on August 17, 2021 via a press release and released on August 26.

Specifications

Design and hardware 
The Pixel 5a is built with an aluminum body and Gorilla Glass 3 for the screen. The device is available in a single color, Mostly Black. The housing has a thick coating of plastic, while the power button is textured. The back houses a capacitive fingerprint sensor centered below the camera lens. It has stereo loudspeakers, one located on the bottom edge and the other doubling as the earpiece, and a 3.5mm headphone jack. A USB-C port is used for charging and connecting other accessories.

The Pixel 5a uses the Qualcomm Snapdragon 765G system-on-chip (consisting of eight Kryo 475 cores, an Adreno 620 GPU and a Hexagon 696 DSP), with 6 GB of LPDDR4X RAM and 128 GB of non-expandable UFS 2.1 internal storage. The Snapdragon 765G allows for standard 5G connectivity, however only "sub-6" networks are supported.

The Pixel 5a has a 4680mAh battery, and is capable of fast charging at up to 18W. It has an IP67 water protection rating, an upgrade over its predecessor which lacked water protection.

The Pixel 5a features a 6.34-inch (161mm) 1080p OLED display with HDR support. The display has a 20:9 aspect ratio, and a circular cutout in the upper left hand corner for the front-facing camera.

The Pixel 5a includes dual rear-facing cameras located within a raised square module. The wide 28 mm 77° f/1.7 lens has the Sony Exmor IMX363 12.2-megapixel sensor, while the ultrawide 107° f/2.2 lens has a 16-megapixel sensor; the front-facing camera uses an 8-megapixel sensor. It is capable of recording 4K video at 30 or 60fps.

Software 
The Pixel 5a shipped with Android 11 and Google Camera 8.2 at launch, with features such as Call Screen and a Personal Safety app. It is expected to receive 3 years of major OS upgrades with support extending until August 2024. It is the first Pixel phone not to ship with unlimited storage in high definition on Google Photos. In October 2021, the Pixel 5a was updated to Android 12 and in August 2022, the Pixel 5a was updated to Android 13 .

Known issues 
 The Pixel 5a overheats when recording 4K 60fps videos. It can only record 4 minutes of 4K video (or 30 minutes of 1080p video) before it shuts down. Google continues to investigate the overheating issue.
 There are touchscreen issues with the bottom half of the display. Google is investigating them.

References

External links 
 

Android (operating system) devices
Discontinued smartphones
Google hardware
Google Pixel
Mobile phones introduced in 2021
Mobile phones with 4K video recording
Mobile phones with multiple rear cameras